Bagholi is a village located in Jhunjhunu district, Rajasthan, India. It is within a locally self-governing Scheduled Area.

Overview
Bagholi, located in udaipurwatitehsil and surrounded by the Aravali Range of mountains, has 8 Rajput  panas, each containing a separate haveli (manor). Brahmin and Baniya have individual havelis. Most local Baniya have moved to Kolkata, specifically for business in Burrabazar.

The largest haveli belongs to the Thakur Sahab Phool Singh Ji, who is well known in Paintalisa. He has led construction of this haveli throughout his life; it spreads around 22 bigha (approximately ) centred in this village.

Thakur Durg Singh Ji ruled for approximately 25 years as sarpanch of gram panchayat, succeeded by Thakur Sahab Bhagwan Singh Ji for 5 years.

The village has the area's first electrical grid and provides water to the villages and nearby khetri.

See also
Thikanas of Shekhawati
Shekhawati

References

Villages in Jhunjhunu district